A flameless ration heater (FRH), colloquially an MRE heater, is a form of self-heating food packaging included in U.S. military Meal, Ready-to-Eat (MRE) rations (since the early 1990s) or similar rations, capable of raising the temperature of an  entrée (main course) by  in twelve minutes, which has no visible flame.

The ration heater contains finely powdered magnesium metal, alloyed with a small amount of iron and table salt. To activate the reaction, a small amount of water is added, and the boiling point of water is quickly reached as the exothermic reaction proceeds.

Chemical reaction 

Ration heaters generate heat in an electron-transfer process called an oxidation-reduction reaction.  Water oxidizes magnesium metal, according to the following chemical reaction:

 Mg + 2H2O → Mg(OH)2 + H2 [+ heat (q)]

This reaction is analogous to iron being rusted by oxygen, and proceeds at about the same slow rate, which is too slow to generate usable heat. To accelerate the reaction, metallic iron particles and table salt (NaCl) are mixed with the magnesium particles.

Iron and magnesium metals, when suspended in an electrolyte, form a galvanic cell that can generate electricity. When water is added to a ration heater, it dissolves the salt to form a salt-water electrolyte, thereby turning each particle of magnesium and iron into a tiny battery. Because the magnesium and iron particles are in contact, they essentially become thousands of tiny short-circuited batteries which quickly burn out, producing heat in a process the patent holders call "supercorroding galvanic cells".

One brand of self-heating rations uses 7.5 grams of a powdered magnesium-iron alloy, consisting of 95% magnesium and 5% iron by weight, 0.5 grams of salt, in addition to an inert filler and anti-foaming agent.

Confined space hazard 

The United States Department of Transportation (DOT) Federal Aviation Administration (FAA) conducted testing and released a report which in summary states "... the release of hydrogen gas from these flameless ration heaters is of a sufficient quantity to pose a potential hazard on board a passenger aircraft." This testing was performed on commercial grade 'heater meals' which consisted of an unenclosed flameless heat pouch, a bag of salt water, a styrofoam saucer/tray and a meal in a sealed, microwavable/boilable bowl.

Disposal 

MRE heaters that have not been properly activated must be disposed of as hazardous waste. Disposing of an
un-activated MRE heater in a solid waste container is against United States law. Un-activated MRE heaters pose a
potential fire hazard if they become wet when turned in at a landfill site. MRE heaters must be disposed of in
approved solid waste containers aboard the installation after they have been properly activated. The FRH can be disposed of as household waste after it is activated and cools down.

See also 

 Active packaging

References 

Military food of the United States
Heaters
Packaging
Military equipment introduced in the 1990s